is a Japanese writer of genre fiction. She has won numerous Japanese literary awards, including the Yoshikawa Eiji Prize for New Writers, the Yoshikawa Eiji Prize for Literature, the Shiba Ryotaro Prize, the Yamamoto Shūgorō Prize, and the Naoki Prize. Her work has been widely adapted for film, television, manga, and video games, and has been translated into over a dozen languages.

Early life and education
Miyabe was born in Tokyo, Japan in 1960. Her mother was a seamstress and her father was an assembly line worker at a factory. She graduated from Sumidagawa High School, then attended a business training school before taking an administrative job at a law office.

Career
Miyabe started writing novels at the age of 23. In 1984, while working at a law office, Miyabe began to take writing classes at a writing school run by the Kodansha publishing company. She made her literary debut in 1987 with 'Our Neighbour is a Criminal' "Warera ga rinjin no hanzai" (我らが隣人の犯罪), which won the 26th All Yomimono Mystery Novel Newcomer Prize and the Japan Mystery Writers Association Prize. She has since written dozens of novels and won numerous literary prizes.

Miyabe's novel , set at the beginning of Japan's lost decade and telling the story of a Tokyo police inspector's search for a missing woman who might be an identity thief trying to get clear of debt, was published by Futabasha in 1992. The next year Kasha won the Yamamoto Shūgorō Prize, which is awarded for a new literary work that excels at storytelling in any genre. Kasha was adapted into a television movie by TV Asahi in 1994, then again in 2011. The Japanese version of the book sold millions of copies. An English translation of Kasha, translated by Alfred Birnbaum, was published by Kodansha International under the title All She Was Worth in 1997. Marilyn Stasio of The New York Times positively noted the relationship between the "spare style and measured pace" of Birnbaum's translation and the "somber tone of Miyuki's theme" of individual value in a consumerist economy, while Cameron Barr of The Christian Science Monitor wrote that the book's treatment of privacy and data tracking would leave the impression that "personal privacy is a rickety antique."

, a multiple perspective murder mystery set in Tokyo's Arakawa ward and written in the form of research interviews conducted in mostly polite language with the suspect, neighbors, and family members of the victims, was published in book form in 1998. Riyū won the 17th Japan Adventure Fiction Association Prize in the Japanese novel category that same year. In 1999 Riyū won the 120th Naoki Prize. Scholar Noriko Chino has described Riyū as "one of the masterpieces of postwar fictional social criticism." Riyū was adapted into a Nobuhiko Obayashi movie that was first shown on the Wowow television channel before its 2004 theatrical release.

Miyabe's novel , about a police detective pursuing a girl with pyrokinetic powers, was published in the same year as Riyū. It was adapted into the 2000 Toho film Pyrokinesis, starring Akiko Yada and Masami Nagasawa. An English version of Crossfire, translated by Deborah Stuhr Iwabuchi and Anna Husson Isozaki, was published in 2006, with Kirkus Reviews calling it "the most conventional of her three novels translated into English". In 2003 Kadokawa Shoten published Miyabe's fantasy novel Brave Story, a story about a boy with a troubled home life who finds a portal to another world. Brave Story became a bestseller in Japan, and has since been adapted into an anime film, a manga series, and a series of video games. The English version of the novel, translated by Alexander O. Smith, won the Mildred L. Batchelder Award in 2008.

Writing style
Miyabe has written novels in several different genres, including science fiction, mystery fiction, historical fiction, social commentary, and young adult literature.  Outside of Japan she is better known for her crime and fantasy novels. English translations of her work include Crossfire (クロスファイア), published in 1998, and Kasha (火車), translated by Alfred Birnbaum as All She Was Worth, published in 1999. Literary scholar Amanda Seaman called Kasha "a watershed moment in the history of women's detective fiction" that inspired "a new wave of women mystery writers."

A common theme in Miyabe's work is community, particularly the effects of consumerism in Japanese society on family and community relationships.

Awards
 1992 45th Mystery Writers of Japan Award for Best Novel: The Sleeping Dragon
 1992 13th Yoshikawa Eiji Prize for New Writers: Honjo Fukagawa Fushigi-zōshi
 1993 6th Yamamoto Shūgorō Prize: All She Was Worth
 1997 18th Japan SF Award: Gamōtei Jiken
 1998 17th Japan Adventure Fiction Association Prize: Riyū (The Reason)
 1999 120th Naoki Prize (1998下): Riyū (The Reason)
 2001 5th Shiba Ryotaro Prize: Puppet Master
 2007 41st Yoshikawa Eiji Prize for Literature: Namonaki Doku (Nameless Poison)
 2008 Batchelder Award for Best Translated Children's Book: Brave Story

Bibliography

Books in Japanese
 , Tokyo Sogensha, 1989, 
 , Shinchosha, 1989, 
 , Bungeishunjū, 1990, 
 , Kobunsha, 1990, 
 , Shinchosha, 1990, 
 , Shuppan Geijutsusha, 1991, 
 , Shin Jinbutsu Ōraisha, 1991, 
 , Jitsugyo no Nihon Sha, 1991, 
 , Shin Jinbutsu Ōraisha, 1992, 
 , Chuo Koronsha, 1992, 
 , 1992, 
 , Futabasha, 1992, 
 , Kobunsha, 1992, 
 , Bungeishunjū, 1992, 
 , Kodansha, 1993, 
 , Shin Jinbutsu Ōraisha, 1993, 
 , Shinchosha, 1993, 
 , Shueisha, 1994, 
 , Shinchosha, 1994, 
 , Chuo Koronsha, 1995, 
 , PHP Kenkyūjo, 1995, 
 , Kobunsha, 1995, 
 , Bungeishunjū, 1996, 
 , Mainichi Shinbunsha, 1996, 
 , Shin Jinbutsu Ōraisha, 1996, 
 , Shin Jinbutsu Ōraisha, 1997, 
 , Tōkyō Sōgensha, 1997, 
 , Asahi Shinbunsha, 1998, 
 , Kobunsha, 1998, 
 , Kodansha, 2000, 
 , Kadokawa Shoten, 2000, 　
 , Shogakkan, 2001, 
 , Shueisha, 2001, 
  volumes 1-4, Tokuma Shoten, 2001–07,  (vol. 1)
 , PHP Kenkyūjo, 2002, 
 , Kadokawa Shoten, 2003, 
 , Bungeishunjū, 2003, 
 , Kodansha, 2004, 
 , Kodansha, 2005,  (vol. 1)  (vol. 2)
 , Shin Jinbutsu Ōraisha, 2005,  (vol. 1)  (vol. 2)
 , Gentōsha, 2006, 
 , Bungeishunjū, 2007,  (vol. 1)  (vol. 2)
 , Kadokawa Shoten, 2008, 
 , Mainichi Shinbunsha, 2009,  (vol. 1)  (vol. 2)
 , Kodansha, 2010,

Selected works in English

Crime/thriller novels
All She Was Worth (original title: Kasha), trans. Alfred Birnbaum, Kodansha International, 1996, 
Crossfire, trans. Deborah Iwabuchi and Anna Isozaki, Kodansha International, 2005, 
Shadow Family (original title: R.P.G.), trans. Juliet Winters Carpenter, Kodansha International, 2005, 
The Devil's Whisper (original title: Majutsu wa sasayaku), trans. Deborah Iwabuchi, Kodansha International, 2007, 
The Sleeping Dragon (original title: Ryū wa nemuru), trans. Deborah Iwabuchi, Kodansha International, 2009, 
Puppet Master (original title: Mohōhan), trans. Ginny Tapley Takemori, Creek & River Co., 2014–2016, released only in five ebook volumes

Fantasy novels
Brave Story, trans. Alexander O. Smith, VIZ Fiction, 2007, 
The Book of Heroes (original title: Eiyu no sho), trans. Alexander O. Smith, Haikasoru, 2009, 
Ico: Castle in the Mist, trans. Alexander O. Smith, Haikasoru, 2011, 
The Gate of Sorrows, trans. Jim Hubbert, Haikasoru, 2016,

Short stories
"The Futon Room" (original title: "Futon-beya"), trans. Stephen A. Carter, Kaiki: Uncanny Tales from Japan, Volume 1: Tales of Old Edo, 2009
Apparitions: Ghosts of Old Edo, trans. Daniel Huddleston, Haikasoru, 2013, 
"A Drowsing Dream of Shinjū" (original title: "Inemuri shinjū")
"Cage of Shadows" (original title: "Kage rō")
"The Futon Storeroom" (original title: "Futon-beya")
"The Plum Rains Fall" (original title: "Ume no ame furu")
"The “Oni” of the Adachi House" (original title: "Adachi ke no oni")
"A Woman's Head" (original title: "Onna no kubi")
"The Oni in the Autumn Rain" (original title: "Shigure Oni")
"Ash Kagura" (original title: "Hai kagura")
"The Mussel Mound" (original title: "Shijimi-zuka")
"Chiyoko", Phantasm Japan: Fantasies Light and Dark, From and About Japan, 2014

Essay
 My Favourite Mystery, "An Incident" by Shohei Ooka (Mystery Writers of Japan, Inc. )

Film and other adaptations

Films
 Pyrokinesis, Toho, 2000
 Mohōhan, Toho, 2002
 Brave Story, Gonzo, 2006
 Helpless, CJ E&M, 2012
 Solomon's Perjury, Shochiku, 2015

Television

 Shuku Satsujin (1988)
 Majutsu wa sasayaku (TV movie), NTV, 1990
 Saboten no Hana (1991)
 Unmei no Juko (based on "Snark Gari")(1992)
 Tatta Hitori (1992)
 Henshin (1993)
 Kasha: Kādo hasan no onna! (1994 TV movie)
 Isshun no Sinjitsu (1994)
 Level Seven (1994)
 Ryū wa Nemuru (1994)
 Iwazunioite (1997)
 Gamoutei Jiken, NHK, 1998
 Moshichi no Jikienbo (2001, 2002, 2003)
 R.P.G., NHK, 2003
 理由 (TV movie), Wowow, 2004
 Nagai Nagai Satsujin (TV movie), Wowow, 2007
 Perfect Blue (TV movie), Wowow, 2010
 Hansai (Anthology episode), Fuji TV, 2010
 Majutsu wa sasayaku (TV movie), Fuji TV, 2011
 Kasha (TV movie), TV Asahi, 2011
 Stepfather Step, TBS, 2012
 Perfect Blue, TBS, 2012
 Riyū (TV movie), TBS, 2012
 Snark Gari (TV movie), TBS, 2012
 Nagai Nagai Satsujin (TV movie), TBS , 2012
 Level Seven (TV movie), TBS, 2012
 Samishii Kariudo (TV movie), Fuji TV, 2013
 Kogure Shashinkan, NHK, 2013
 Nomonaki Doku, TBS, 2013
 Petero no souretsu, TBS, 2014
 Osoroshi, NHK, 2014
 Sakura Housara, NHK, 2014
 Bonkura, NHK, 2014-2015
 模倣犯 ,  TV Tokyo, 2016
 Solomon's Perjury, JTBC, 2016-2017
 Rakuen, Wowow, 2017

Manga
 Brave Story, 2007

See also

References

External links
 Miyuki Miyabe at J'Lit Books from Japan
 
 

1960 births
Japanese children's writers
Japanese crime fiction writers
Japanese fantasy writers
Japanese horror writers
Japanese women novelists
Naoki Prize winners
Mystery Writers of Japan Award winners
Living people
Japanese women children's writers
Women science fiction and fantasy writers
Women horror writers
Women mystery writers
Writers from Tokyo